Li Daoyuan (466 or 472 in Zhuo County, Hebei – 527) was a Chinese geographer, writer, and politician during the Northern Wei Dynasty. He is known as the author of the Commentary on the Water Classic (Shuijingzhu), a monumental work on China's geography in ancient times.
 
Li Daoyuan used his position as an official with business in different places to carry field investigations. He is known to have visited the area belonging to the present-day Henan, Shandong, Shanxi, and Jiangsu provinces.
 
Another source for his knowledge was the study of ancient geographical books he had access to, like the Classic of Mountains and Seas (Shanhaijing) completed by the time of the early Western Han Dynasty) and the Water Classic (Shuijing), written by Sang Qin during the Three Kingdoms Period and later commentated on by Jin dynasty writer Guo Pu. Li vastly expanded the Water Classic, doing his own research and fieldwork. The original Water Classic has not survived but covered 127 rivers and streams and contained about 10,000 characters; Li Daoyuan's Commentary on the Waterways Classic (Shui Jing Zhu), discusses 1252 watercourses and contains about 300,000 characters in total. The book maps and describes the rivers and streams along with the history, geography and culture of the surrounding region.

References

5th-century births
527 deaths
Medieval Chinese geographers
Northern Wei politicians
Politicians from Baoding
Scientists from Hebei
Year of birth unknown
Writers from Baoding
6th-century geographers